Gerry Duggan may refer to:

 Gerry Duggan (actor) (1910–1992), Irish-born Australian character actor
 Gerry Duggan (writer), American comics writer, director and photographer